Nasonovo is a rural locality (a selo) and the administrative center of Nasonovskoye Rural Settlement, Valuysky District, Belgorod Oblast, Russia. The population was 1,028 as of 2010. There are 17 streets.

Geography 
Nasonovo is located 15 km northeast of Valuyki (the district's administrative centre) by road. Bezgodovka is the nearest rural locality.

References 

Rural localities in Valuysky District